State Route 50 (SR 50) is a  state highway in the eastern part of the U.S. state of Alabama. The western terminus of the highway is at an intersection with SR 229 near Lake Martin in northeastern Elmore County. The eastern terminus of the highway is at an intersection with U.S. Route 29 (US 29) at Lanett, just west of the Georgia state line.

Route description
From its western terminus, SR 50 assumes an eastward trajectory as it skirts the southern shores of Lake Martin, traveling through rural areas of Elmore and Tallapoosa counties. East of where the highway would cross into Macon County if it were to continue its eastward trajectory, the highway takes a sudden turn to the northeast as it heads towards Camp Hill.

After sharing a brief wrong-way concurrency with US 280 at Camp Hill, SR 50 resumes its eastward trajectory as it crosses into Chambers County. The highway continues eastward, traveling through La Fayette before it reaches its eastern terminus at Lanett.

Major intersections

See also

References

050
Transportation in Elmore County, Alabama
Transportation in Tallapoosa County, Alabama
Transportation in Chambers County, Alabama